American toy company Hasbro launched the fourth incarnation of My Little Pony toyline and media franchise in 2010. This generation is not given any name by Hasbro, but some of later releases of toys are labeled with the subtitle "Friendship Is Magic" (originally given to the namesake 2010 television series). It is unofficially referred to the "Fourth Generation", "Generation Four" or "G4" by collectors.

Outside toys, My Little Pony: Friendship Is Magic (an animated television series commissioned by Hasbro Studios) has served as a flagship media from 2010 until 2019; additionally, one animated feature film (My Little Pony: The Movie) and two television specials (Best Gift Ever and Rainbow Roadtrip) were produced during the period.

In late 2019, Hasbro have revamped the appearance of pony characters. The new toys with renewed, caricatured appearance were released in November 2019. It was followed by the animated series, My Little Pony: Pony Life, in 2020. Another stop-motion animated webseries, My Little Pony: Stop Motion Shorts, was released in January 2020.

The toys and media produced during this incarnation take place in the fictional location named Equestria, a society inhabited by three kinds of ponies (earth ponies, unicorns and pegasi) and other species, with winged unicorns – named "alicorns" in later releases despite the word's origin – having royal status.

With the success of the Friendship Is Magic television series, it also generated a dedicated fandom. The line grossed over US$650 million in retail sales in 2013, and $1 billion annually in retail sales in 2014, and 2015. This particular era has an anthropomorphic spin-off, subtitled Equestria Girls.

Toys 

The toyline often features nine characters – Twilight Sparkle, Rainbow Dash, Fluttershy, Pinkie Pie, Applejack, Rarity, Spike the Dragon, Princess Celestia, and Princess Luna – who are also the major protagonists in the Friendship Is Magic television series and other related media.

Beginning in 2013, the toys of Twilight Sparkle (originally a unicorn) were modified to have a pair of wings as well, a move that sparked criticism. Other official media followed the suit to reflect that, with Friendship Is Magic television series having a dedicated episode as a finale of season 3, and IDW's Friendship Is Magic comics reflecting the change since Issue #13 (November 2013).

With Hasbro's November 2019 announcement of My Little Pony: Pony Life television series, which features ponies in a revamped, caricatured appearance, relevant toys were released in the same month.

 Playful Ponies The first line of the toys were the Playful Ponies. These feature a pony with brushable hair, a saddle or wagon, an animal companion and a comb. The first six ponies released were Twilight Sparkle, Rainbow Dash, Fluttershy, Pinkie Pie, Applejack and Rarity. There are also promotional packs: two-packs, released in Europe. Event Singles were also released in a particular month, including a Valentine's Day Pinkie Pie, released in February 2011, and an Easter Fluttershy, released in April 2011.Hasbro later announced that the second wave of toys would be released in March 2011. Due to the 2011 Tōhoku earthquake and tsunami, however, the release was postponed and the toys were released the following month. The second wave omits Rainbow Dash and Fluttershy and includes two new ponies: Cheerilee and Lily Blossom. The third wave was released in May 2011, introducing four new ponies: Cupcake, Lulu Luck, Dewdrop Dazzle and Blossomforth. Wave four was released in July 2011, introducing six new ponies: Feathermay, Flitterheart, Snowcatcher, Twinkleshine, Honeybuzz and Plumsweet.The fifth wave was released in early 2012, with two new debuting characters: Cherry Pie and Diamond Rose. Later on in May 2012, Lyra Heartstrings, Trixie Lulamoon, Cherry Berry and Sunny Rays, characters who first appeared in the Friendship Is Magic television series, also debuted as playful ponies.

 Collector series In the 2012 New York Toy Fair, Hasbro announced plans to release several exclusive toys for collectors. The characters represented were actually requested by fans of the animated series and were released in September 2012. The characters in this line include an animation accurate Princess Celestia, Nightmare Moon, DJ Pon-3, Lemony Gem, Flower Wishes/Daisy and Zecora.

 Story packs Story packs (the playsets in the toyline) include at least one pony, one large playset piece and numerous accessories, and were released like the Playful Ponies, as in previous incarnations. Story-pack exclusives include Sweetie Belle, Apple Bloom, Scootaloo, Sweetie Swirl, Star Swirl (Europe only), Princess Cadance and Shining Armor.

 Ride-Along Ponies The Ride-Along Ponies are special versions of the Playful Ponies, each with a scooter and an animal companion. Three sets were released in July 2011 with Wave Four of the Playful Ponies.

 So-Soft Newborn These versions are identical in design to their "G3" counterparts, except they are plush-bodied and are designed to be resemble infants. There are seven characters are in this line: Sunny Daze, Sweetie Belle, Rainbow Dash, Pinkie Pie, Apple Sprout, Princess Skyla and Spike. Each of them includes a pacifier or a bottle.

 Shine Bright Ponies The Shine Bright Ponies have a light-up section when their saddle is pressed. They are slightly bigger than the Playful Ponies, and their legs are posable. The ponies Rarity, Pinkie Pie, and Rainbow Dash were released at first. In the United States, Fluttershy, Twilight Sparkle (along with Starbeam Twinkle) and Princess Luna (along with Pinkie Pie) were later released as Target exclusives.

 Fashion Style Ponies Fashion Style Ponies are larger versions of the Playful Ponies, each with a unique dress and accessories; two were released each wave.

 Glimmer Wing Ponies The Glimmer Wing Ponies have butterfly-like wings on their backs which can be moved. The ponies are: Rainbow Dash, Rarity and Ploomette. In 2012, Daisy Dreams and Fluttershy were released. Later sets included Glimmer Wings Sweet Song and Fluttershy and Glimmer Wings Diamond Rose and Pinkie Pie. "Sonic Rainboom", the sixteenth episode of Friendship Is Magic season 1, acts as a tie-in.

 Jumbo plush In the United States, several jumbo-plush pony characters were released as Toys "R" Us exclusives, while a Special Storyteller Twilight Sparkle Plush was released as a Target exclusive.

 Ponyville singles The Ponyville singles are small, molded plastic toys. The main method of distribution is in individual, opaque bags so that the toy inside cannot be seen. In the United States, these toys have also been released in collector sets.

 Canterlot Released in 2011, it is a line centering on Canterlot, the capital city of Equestria, where Princesses Celestia and Luna live. In the United States, it was released exclusively on Target stores, as Hasbro had an agreement in July 2011. 

 Pony Royal Wedding and the Crystal Empire In 2012, Hasbro revealed several new toys in the 2012 New York Toy Fair, themed around a royal wedding between characters Princess Cadance and Shining Armor. Alongside the release of them, several new characters were confirmed to be released as Playful Ponies as well as characters that were requested by the fans to be released in toy form. The promotion included the same themed area in stores with dedicated stands and signage, and a two-part finale of season 2 of Friendship is Magic, titled "A Canterlot Wedding".

 Potion Ponies Released in November 2019 in the United States, the toys in this line share the caricatured appearance with the ponies in the Pony Life animated series. A person styles the pony’s mane and tail by pouring a "potion" (or spraying it, depending on the product) over the pony.

Media

Animated productions 

My Little Pony: Friendship Is Magic is an animated television series produced by DHX Media's 2D animation studio (formerly known as Studio B Productions) in Vancouver, Canada, for Hasbro Studios (now Allspark) in the United States. The series premiered on Sunday, October 10, 2010 on The Hub (now Discovery Family), an American television channel partly owned by Hasbro. Friendship Is Magic was developed by Lauren Faust, who was a fan of the original property in her youth, and invented her own adventure stories for the toys in place of the stereotypical "girly" stories from the 1980s' features. The series became the most successful show on The Hub, popularized the brand, and gained a notable fan following.

An animated feature film based on the Friendship Is Magic characters was first announced on October 20, 2014, in an interview with Hasbro Studios CEO Stephen Davis by Variety. Released on October 6, 2017, in the United States, the new My Little Pony: The Movie is Hasbro's first animated feature film from its Allspark Pictures film division. It was distributed worldwide by Lionsgate, with the exception of China. Thiessen directed the film with McCarthy writing the film and act as the film's co-executive producer alongside Mike Vogel. Originally, Joe Ballarini was the scriptwriter for the film. 

The film concerns the "Mane Six" ponies – Twilight Sparkle, Applejack, Fluttershy, Pinkie Pie, Rainbow Dash, and Rarity – journeying beyond Equestria to stop a threat looming over their hometown of Ponyville. Hasbro's president, Stephan Davis, said of the film that "I think it gives us an opportunity to tell a bigger story, that maybe we [can't] tell on television" and that "[it's] also an opportunity to broaden the franchise". 

The main cast from Friendship Is Magic reprised their roles alongside original characters voiced by Kristin Chenoweth, Emily Blunt, Michael Peña, Uzo Aduba, Liev Schreiber, Taye Diggs, Sia, and Zoe Saldana. The film received a mixed reaction from film critics.

Two television specials were produced during the period. My Little Pony: Best Gift Ever, a holiday season special animated at DHX Media's Vancouver 2D animation studio, was first broadcast in the United States on October 27, 2018 on Discovery Family. Another special, My Little Pony: Rainbow Roadtrip, was animated at Boulder Media (an Irish studio which Hasbro acquired in 2016) and broadcast on June 29, 2019 on Discovery Family.

My Little Pony: Pony Life, another animated television series commissioned by Allspark Animation, premiered in the United States on November 7, 2020 on Discovery Family. The series, which succeeds Friendship Is Magic, features ponies in a caricatured appearance. The cast of six main characters in Friendship Is Magic have reprised their roles in the new series. Hasbro also plans to release additional animated shorts on My Little Pony's official YouTube channel.

 My Little Pony animated productions

Interactive software 

In conjunction with Ruckus Media, Hasbro released an iOS application Twilight Sparkle, Teacher for a Day in October 2011. It gives children practice in reading, incorporating mini-games. Several eBooks based on Friendship Is Magic, including story versions of the Ruckus applications, have been released for the Barnes & Noble Nook, in partnership with Hasbro.

Hasbro has licensed Gameloft to create Friendship Is Magic video games for mobile devices, with the first game, My Little Pony: Friendship Is Magic, reaching the market on November 8, 2012. The first game is a village-building game, featuring action-based mini-games for iOS and Android devices. Though the game is aimed at younger players, Gameloft's Barnabé Anglade stated that there are nods to the show's brony fandom, such as the inclusion of fan-favorite characters and popular background ponies.

Publications

Comics 

The American My Little Pony comics are published by IDW Publishing under license from Hasbro. The first issue of the flagship title, Friendship Is Magic, was published in November 2012, and has proven a highly successful venture with a larger circulation than most competing titles. The series is written by Katie Cook and illustrated by Andy Price. The first issue, by early October, had already gained over 90,000 pre-orders, making it a better seller than other comics for that month. By early November, the title had exceeded 100,000 pre-orders, and IDW committed to a second run of the issue to meet the additional demand. The first issue features 19 different covers, most exclusive to specific comic book shops and chains and only available in limited numbers. The comic, through its first eight issues, remains IDW's most successful title, and along with The Walking Dead, remain one of the few non-DC, non-Marvel comics to regularly break the top 100 comics sold each month.

A series of Japanese comics by Akira Himekawa began appearing in Shogakukan's Pucchigumi magazine in Japan on August 12, 2013. It was tied in with the Japanese launch of the 2010 incarnation in early 2013 by the license holders at the time,  and Bushiroad (All of relevant regional licenses were later taken over by Sega Toys). The first Akira Himekawa series completed its run in February 2014. The second, 80-page trade paperback was released on October 16, 2014.

Seven Seas Entertainment is releasing a series of comics with manga aesthetics titled My Little Pony: The Manga – A Day in the Life of Equestria (not to be confused with 2013 Japanese comics), with the first book having been released in June 2019.

Various "stock comics" also appeared in multiple languages for certain mainstream children's magazines, such as UK-based Redan Publishing's Sparkle World.

Literature 
Hasbro has partnered with Little, Brown and Company to publish several children's books aimed at different reading levels involving the Friendship Is Magic franchise, including an official series guidebook, starting in April 2013. , more than 3 million My Little Pony books published by the company have been sold, and they have extended their Hasbro deal through to 2018, as well as adding other Hasbro properties such as Transformers.

Other merchandises

Soundtracks 

A twelve-track soundtrack, Friendship Is Magic: Songs of Friendship and Magic (Music from the Original TV Series), was released on iTunes on December 6, 2013, featuring select songs from the first and second seasons of the show.

An eleven-track soundtrack, Friendship Is Magic: Songs of Ponyville (Music from the Original TV Series), was released on iTunes on April 21, 2014, featuring select songs from the third and fourth seasons of the show.

A ten-track soundtrack, Friendship Is Magic: Songs of Harmony, was released on iTunes on April 13, 2015, featuring select songs from the show's fourth season, plus the season two song "The Perfect Stallion" (from "Hearts and Hooves Day"), full versions of both "Find the Music in You" (from "Filli Vanilli") and  "Let the Rainbow Remind You" (from "Twilight's Kingdom – Part 2"), as well as a mash-up between "Winter Wrap Up" and "A True, True Friend".

Another ten-track soundtrack, Friendship Is Magic: Pinkie's Party Playlist, was released on iTunes on July 7, 2016, featuring select songs from the show's fourth and fifth seasons, as well as a re-recorded version of the "Pony Pokey" song from season one.

Remix album 
Based on the popularity of adult My Little Pony fandom's remixing of songs from the show, Hasbro and Lakeshore Records developed an EDM remix album entitled DJ Pon-3 Presents My Little Pony Friendship Is Magic Remixed. Originally set for release in late 2014 but ultimately released digitally on June 2, 2015, the album and in retail June 23, 2015, contains 13 tracks that remix the original show compositions from Ingram with various artists. The album was produced by Justin Lassen who wanted to keep an all-ages enjoyment and avoid excessive repetition of dubstep-based remixes.

Christmas album 
A Christmas-themed album, titled It's a Pony Kind of Christmas, was released for on-demand streaming and digital release on November 6, 2015. Featuring performances by the cast of My Little Pony: Friendship Is Magic as well as the Phoenix Chamber Choir from Vancouver, the album contains original holiday-themed songs as well as covers of traditional Christmas songs and an extended version of "The Heart Carol" (from the episode "Hearth's Warming Eve"). Within 24 hours after its release, the album peaked at #1 on both iTunes and Amazon.

An expanded version, titled Friendship Is Magic – It's a Pony Kind of Christmas, was released on iTunes on October 7, 2016. The expanded version includes the songs from the season six episode "A Hearth's Warming Tail" (Hearth's Warming Eve is Here Once Again, Say Goodbye to the Holiday, The Seeds of the Past, Pinkie's Present, and Luna's Future).

Card games 

Enterplay, LLC has been licensed to create trading cards of Friendship Is Magic, with a first set released in early 2012 and a second set published in 2013. In addition to the base cards, Enterplay has offered limited edition cards at various fan conventions, which have since become of card collector's value. A Friendship Is Magic-themed collectible card game by Enterplay, My Little Pony Collectible Card Game, was released in November 2013. The card game has been considered successful by Enterplay, helping them to boost their sales within the hobby game sector, and have led to several expansions to the card series.

Others 
In April 2013, Hasbro and Build-A-Bear Workshop began offering Friendship Is Magic-based plush toys for customization. Sales of My Little Pony toys were three times as large in 2013 than in 2003, and have helped Hasbro to promote other lines of toys aimed at girls. Hasbro stated that merchandising tied to Friendship Is Magic lead to franchise sales over $650 million in 2014, and others have considered the show's popularity to make 2015 the "year of the unicorn" for toy and related manufacturers.

On April 16, 2013, World Trade Jewelers signed a deal with Hasbro to make Friendship Is Magic jewelry. The collection was released for consumer release in October 2013.

River Horse in the United Kingdom developed and released a series of board games titled My Little Pony: Tails of Equestria. In the United States, it is distributed by Shinobi7.

Seven Seas Entertainment released a manga series (titled My Little Pony: The Manga – A Day in the Life of Equestria) in June 2019 and a papercraft book (titled My Little Pony: Friendship is Magic Papercraft – The Mane 6 & Friends) in October 2020.

A video game based on the fifth iteration of the franchise, titled My Little Pony: A Maretime Bay Adventure, was released in May 27, 2022 on the Nintendo Switch.

Fandom 

Despite Hasbro's target demographic of young girls and their parents, this incarnation of the franchise has become a cultural and Internet phenomenon with the new fandom generated by Friendship Is Magic television series, having many male fans between 13 and 35. The response from the Internet has been traced to cartoon and animation fans on the Internet board 4chan, responding to Amidi's negative essay regarding the show and current trends in animation. As a result of the discussion on 4chan, interest in the show spread throughout other parts of the Internet, creating a large fanbase and a multitude of creative works, fan sites, and conventions. The fanbase has adopted the name "brony" (a portmanteau of "bro" and "pony") to describe themselves. The older fanbase had come as a surprise to Hasbro and staff members involved with the show. They have appreciated and embraced the fandom, adding nods to the fans within the show and the toys.

References

See also 
 My Little Pony: Equestria Girls, an extension in anthropomorphic toys, as well as a spin-off media franchise, launched in 2013.

External links 
 

My Little Pony
Hasbro products